Anywhere Festival is an annual Brisbane based festival for performance anywhere but traditional theatre spaces. The first anywhere-but-in-a-traditional-theatre concept was brought to Brisbane in 2011 by creative director Paul Osuch and his partner, Ally McTavish. Their theory is that we need to take traditional story-telling out of theatre buildings and back to where life really takes place, in the community.

The festival – which holds performances anywhere but in a traditional theatre – began in 2011 with 4000 attendees and 31 productions.  Since it began, the Anywhere Festival (they dropped the "Theatre" in 2015) has grown in size and popularity as it inhabited the nooks and crannies of this city of ours 

The idea behind Anywhere is that the art of theatre should not be constrained by, well, a theatre nor by a time frame of two plus hours with interval, or even a genre.

The idea behind Anywhere Festival is that you don't - you shouldn't - have to go to a traditional theatre space to see theatre. You shouldn't have to pay a lot of money for tickets, and artists shouldn't be limited by space or cost or time. For 10 days this month, you can see exciting theatre in parks, backyards, bedrooms, lifts, trains and even on Twitter, not just in Brisbane but as far away as Toowoomba to the west, and Yandina to the north.

"The festival is about theatre anywhere but in a theatre," explains Paul Osuch, the mastermind behind the festival. He started Anywhere with his wife, Alex McTavish. "I could see people wanted exciting theatre that didn't have to happen in a theatre," he says. "What kicked it over the line was when English actor Ian McKellen couldn't find a theatre space in Brisbane to bring his acclaimed Waiting for Godot. I figured that if he had trouble getting into a Brisbane theatre there were probably a lot of less-well-known theatre producers with the same problem."

It wasn't just a lack of available theatre venues that prompted him to act. Osuch says he found many traditional theatre spaces were restrictive, both for audiences and artists, and smothered in an air of "elitism" that was turning people away.

"I find that most performances in a theatre space are just a little sterile. And parking's difficult, the drinks are generally overpriced and, as someone over the height of six foot, I'm not a big fan of theatre seating where I have to watch a show through the gap between my knees," he says. "I feel that the traditional theatre spaces stop more people going to experience it than it regularly attracts. It's been turned into this big thing with a huge infrastructure around it instead of it being something that people feel they can pop along to in their own neighbourhood or do themselves."

"Ultimately, the Anywhere Festival is about entertainment and theatre but it is also about encouraging businesses to engage with their community in a new way", says co-founder and creative producer, Alex McTavish." "It may seem like it is a simple arts festival but community and communion is what it's all about," she says.

The festival is held in Brisbane, Mackay, Frankston and Parramatta.

History

The festival began in 2011 as the Anywhere Festival, Brisbane but became known as the Anywhere Festival in 2014 to expand its remit beyond traditional "theatre". It was created and directed by Paul Osuch and Alex McTavish.

In 2014, the first Anywhere Festival was presented in Frankston and in 2015 grew to include Brisbane, Mackay, Dysart, Middlemount, Moranbah Parramatta and Frankston.

In 2017, the festival expanded to Noosa and Sunshine Coast with Toni Wills and Nycole Prowse joining and Alex McTavish leaving the festival.

2011
The 2011 Anywhere Festival included cabaret, circus, comedy, drama, site specific theatre and kids theatre features productions by  Riot Stage, underground Productions, Black Fox Theatre, Divalution, Cracked Pavement, Rag Tag Productions, Somerset Mills Productions, Flipside Circus, Roundabout theatre, Queensland Arts Council, Gumball Theatre, Edge Improv, Spangles Aura Productions, Booster cushion, The Deconverters, Fractal Theatre, Queensland Shakespeare Ensemble, Two Hours Traffic,  Circa Zoolings, Cradle Productions, Michael Weston Organisation, Soapbox Theatre, Circa Zoo, allison Manson and Imploding Fictions.

2012
The 2012 Anywhere Festival ran from 10 to 19 May 2012 and included the following organisations and theatre practitioners: Arts Queensland, Queensland Theatre Company, Brighton Fringe, Markwell Presents Cinematic Theatre Co, Underground Productions, The Alleyway Collective, Cradle Productions, ELaRT Productions, Hannah Taylor, Tease, Black Fox Theatre, La Petite Famille, 2Muse Productions, Egg Festivals Inc., Musica Viva, Arts Support, Sarah Reinking, La Boite, Stage On Screen, Metro Arts, Woodfordian Institute of Street Performances (WISP), SeeD Theatre, Fixate Productions, HolePunch, Synestheatre, Tessa Waters, Mager & Smythe, Lucy Ingham & Alexander Baden Bryce, Australian Actors Network, Jennifer Bismire, 8 Wing Theatre Co., Two Hours Traffic, heartBeast- vicious theatre ensemble, Flipside Circus, Queensland Wind Orchestra, Oxford Girl Theatre Project, Hidden Room, Edrich, Queensland Shakespeare Ensemble, Belles of Hell, Marcus Lilley Artist, Small Crown Productions, Sandra Carluccio, UQ Drama, Medley Theatre Company, Babushka, Circa.

2013
The 2013 Anywhere Festival changed from a ten-day to twelve-day festival, running from 8 to 19 May.

2014
The 2014 Anywhere Festival ran from 7 to 18 May and included  420 performances of 67 different productions over 27 suburbs of Brisbane. It featured cabaret, circus, comedy, drama, site specific theatre and kids theatre. Festival director Paul Osuch said this year's event, running May 7 to 18, would see pubs, hotels, shops, cafes, parks, churches, homes and even a garage serve as a venue for a range of theatre, dance, music, circus and comedy acts.

2015
The 2014 Anywhere Festival ran from 7 to 24 May across Brisbane, Mackay, Mount Isa and Cairns.

2016
The 2016 Anywhere Festival ran from 5 to 21 May 2016.

2017
The 2017 Anywhere Festival ran from 4 to 21 May 2017 across Brisbane with Sunshine Coast and Noosa becoming part of the festival.

2018
The 2018 Anywhere Festival ran for 18 days from 10-27 Mayacross Brisbane, Sunshine Coast and Noosa. More than 500 artists and arts workers presented 370 diverse performances with cabaret, circus, comedy, drama, dance, poetry, music and site specific theatre all popping up in surprising places.

2019
The 2019 Anywhere Festival ran from 9 to 26 May across Brisbane, Sunshine Coast and Noosa with over 500 performances of 96 shows in 101 different towns and suburbs. The festival featured performances by Violet&Rose productions, Mixed Messages Productions, Independent Graduates from QUT, Magnetic North Theatre Company, Virag Dombay, Cello Dreaming, BYTE Theatre Company, Vulcana, Lightning Bolt Creative, Ritual Theatre, Victoria Posner, XYZ ARI in collaboration with Anthony Elliott Baker, Bec Redsell, Muses Trio, Screech Arts, Chris MartinTalk Is Free Theatre, Cycles in Sync, Linsey Pollak & Lizzie O’Keefe, Phoebe Hilton, Collectivist, Taylor Edwards and Rosa Sottile, Salted Pineapple Productions, Hayley Condon, Emma Lamberton + Brie Jurss, Lady Beard & Co., ThunderBear Productions, Luminescence, Tremayne Gordon, Minola Theatre, Amanda Cole and Kim Kirkman, Half Hitch, The Adwah Haswah Theatre Company of Wonder and Magic, The Humour Experiment, Wester-Dyer Productions, The Shadow Collective, Underground Productions, Riley Cope Creative, Relativity, 3bCreative, Spiral Dance Company, Sunshine Troupe Inc, Tim Ross and Kit Warhurst, Lonnie Gilroy, Senaai Chapple & Johanna Lyon, Aaron Ducker, Etch Events, Prathana Thevar-Brink, Maybe Mad Theatre Company,  Moment of Inertia Productions, Gary Nostrils, Local Upstarts, Inc, Comedy Lounge, Shiny Tin Productions, The Big Crew, Ben Burns, Ben Keane and friends!, InsideOutside Theatre Company, Big Fork Theatre, Ruckus, Edge Improv, Toukie Wood, browbrow, Republic of Song, supported by Vulcana, SMacNifiCo, Alex Harper, Noah Milne, Planet Clare, Red Chair, Gabe Francis, The Singer’s Anatomy, Fools Theatre Company , The Owl’s Nest, Talk of the Town Storytelling Services, Chance Collective, Lightning Bolt Creative, Sho Eba, Gemma Elsom & Joseph Wilson- The Drama Merchant, Red Robin Entertainment, The Smooth End of the Pineapple, Sharon Moore, Little Seed Theatre Company, The Reaction Theory, Fiona Bryant and co., Act/React, D.I.V.E. Theatre Collective, Scott Wings, Interim Theatre, Mira Ball Productions.

2020
The 2020 Anywhere Festival was due to run 7 to 24 May 2020 and was cancelled due to COVID-19. An out of festival season was run between June to September featuring 21 productions across 32 towns and suburbs using online shows with Zoom and performances in driveways to meet social distancing and venue restrictions while theatres were unable to reopen. The driveway performance idea lead the way for the Brisbane Festival Street Serenade program, announced shortly after for a September season.

See also

List of festivals in Brisbane

References

External links
 
 Arts Queensland Case Study of the 2011 Anywhere Theatre Festival
 Arts Queensland Creative Capital Strategy document referring to Anywhere Theatre Festival
 Paul Osuch interview with The Australian
 Commissioned Blog by Festival Director Paul Osuch on Anywhere, anytime
 Green Room interview with Paul Osuch
 "Creative Spaces Case Studies

Theatre in Brisbane
Festivals in Brisbane
Tourist attractions in Brisbane
Companies based in Brisbane
Festivals established in 2011
2011 establishments in Australia
Fringe festivals in Australia
Site-specific theatre